The Council of State is a constitutionally established advisory body in the Netherlands to the government and States General that officially consists of members of the royal family and Crown-appointed members generally having political, commercial, diplomatic or military experience. It was founded in 1531, making it one of the world's oldest still-functioning state organisations.

The Council of State must be consulted by the cabinet on proposed legislation before a law is submitted to parliament. The Council of State Administrative Law division also serves as one of the four highest courts of appeal in administrative matters. The King is president of the Council of State but he seldom chairs meetings. The Vice-President of the Council of State chairs meetings in his absence and is the de facto major personality of the institution. Under Dutch constitutional law, the Vice-President of the Council is acting head of state when there is no monarch such as if the royal family were to become extinct.

History

Habsburg Netherlands
Charles V, Holy Roman Emperor founded a Council of State on 1 October 1531 as one of three Collateral Councils (the other two were the Privy Council or Secret Council and the Council of Finances) to advise his sister Mary of Hungary, his regent in the Habsburg Netherlands, and her successors, on les grandz et principaulx affaires et ceux qui concernent l'état conduycte et gouvernement des pais, securite et deffense desdits pays de pardeca, in other words the main questions of government, foreign affairs and defense. Members of the council were the great nobles of the realm and a few of the great prelates.

After the accession of Philip II of Spain to the throne and his departure to Spain in 1559 the Council became the forum for the strife between the Spanish representatives in the Council, led by Antoine Perrenot de Granvelle and the Netherlandish grandees like the Prince of Orange and the Counts of Horne and Egmont. The latter faction felt themselves pushed aside and resigned in 1567, leaving the field to a Spanish-dominated Council at the start of the Dutch Revolt. After the death of Luis de Requesens y Zúñiga, then governor-general of the Habsburg Netherlands, in 1576, the Council of State temporarily assumed his authority as representative of king Philip, awaiting the arrival of the new governor-general, Don Juan. Before he could arrive the members of the Council were arrested in a coup by the Brussels garrison. Soon afterwards the Pacification of Ghent was concluded pitting the States-General of the Netherlands against the Spanish crown, represented by Don Juan. When the latter retreated to Namur in early 1577 the Council of State split in two rumps, one joining Don Juan (and forming the nucleus of what would become the Council of State of the Spanish Netherlands and later the Austrian Netherlands) the other remaining close to the rebellious States-General. These members were discharged by king Philip in 1578, formally ending the Council as a Habsburg institution in what was to become the Dutch Republic.

Under Anjou and Leicester
When the Duke of Anjou came to be temporarily recognized as the new sovereign of the rebellious provinces in 1581, a new Council of State was appointed to advise him and to perform certain executive duties, pertaining to defense and finances. This Council soon split in two regional councils, one for the area West of the river Meuse, the other for the area East of that river. The first, residing in Antwerp where the States-General also convened, played the main role up to the departure of the Duke. After his departure the (again unified) Council followed the States-General to Middelburg, Delft, and The Hague. After the assassination of the Prince of Orange in 1584 the Council was given new executive powers and temporarily assumed full executive authority in the place of the Prince. The States-General meanwhile took the lead in the search for another protecting sovereign. This resulted in the Treaty of Nonsuch of 1585 with Elizabeth I of England that explicitly assumed a leading role of the Council in the evolving constitution of the provinces of the Union of Utrecht. Article XIV of the treaty authorised Elizabeth to appoint two English representatives on the Council, besides the Governor-General, who would preside the council. The next articles gave far-reaching authority to the Governor-General, acting with the council, in matters of defense, finance and government. For instance, the Stadtholders of the provinces would henceforth be appointed by the Governor-General and the Council (art. XXIV), though the States of Holland and West Friesland preempted this by appointing Maurice, Prince of Orange stadtholder before the Earl of Leicester, who would accept the Governor-Generalship, conferred on him by the States-General against the wish of Elizabeth, arrived in the Netherlands. 
This was the first instance of the way the mighty province of Holland frustrated the policies of Leicester. His attempt to found a new Council of Finances (the old one had been dissolved in 1580), which was supposed to take a number of the financial powers of the Council of State, was quietly thwarted. On the instigation of the Land's Advocate of Holland, Johan van Oldenbarnevelt, who was a member of the Council, more and more executive tasks of the Council were taken over by the States-General, to dilute English influence on the Dutch affairs of state. These tasks and this influence of the Council did not return after Leicester had left the Netherlands at the end of 1587.

Under the Dutch Republic
By 1588 the Council had therefore reached the structure and functions it would possess during the entire existence of the Dutch Republic. The Council was henceforth made up of members appointed by the States-General on the nomination of the Provincial States (usually about 12), with two members (between 1598 and 1625 one) appointed by the English government. The stadtholders of the provinces were ex officio members, at least outside the First Stadtholderless Period and Second Stadtholderless Period. The executive powers of the Council were limited to military policy (both on land and sea); administering the Dutch States Army's financial aspects (naval affairs were administered by the five Admiralties, founded by Leicester); and formulating and executing tax policy for the Generality Lands.

The Council usually played a self-effacing role, as laid down in its Instruction of 1651, at the beginning of the first Stadtholderless Period. However, the secretary of the Council, Simon van Slingelandt played a leading role in an attempt at constitutional reform (which would have greatly increased the executive powers of the Council, as intended in the time of Leicester) in 1717. This attempt came to nothing, however.

After the overthrow of the regime of stadtholder William V, Prince of Orange and the founding of the Batavian Republic in 1795, the Council was dissolved, together with the States-General.

Under the Kingdom of the Netherlands
Though an advisory council with the nostalgic name Council of State was again instituted in the waning days of the Batavian Republic in 1805, and also the successor Kingdom of Holland had an institution with that name (modeled on the contemporary French Council of State), these councils disappeared again during the years of the annexation by France (1810-1813). However, after the restoration of Dutch independence in 1813 a new Council of State was founded as laid down in the Constitutions of 1814 and 1815. These constitutions explicitly stated that all "Acts of Sovereign Dignity" by the Sovereign Prince and later the King, would only be enacted after the advice of the Council was heard. These included both Acts of the States-General and Royal Decrees, important, because the first king, William I of the Netherlands liked to rule by decree. The King presided over the new Council, and the Crown-Prince would be a member ex officio after reaching the age of majority. In practice, however, a vice-president presided over the deliberations of the Council, the King only taking over on ceremonial occasions. Members were appointed from all provinces, both "Dutch" and "Belgian". After the Belgian Revolution of 1830 the Belgian members left. The new Kingdom of Belgium did not institute its own Council of State until 1946 as an administrative court.

Under the new constitution of 1848 the Council of State was reformed in the sense that its structure and functions were delegated to an Organic Law. The first such law (the Council of State Act) was enacted in 1861. The most important innovation of this law was that besides the advisory task of the Council in matters of law giving the Council would also advise in cases in which conflicts between administrative organs (like provinces and municipalities) were put before the Crown (king and ministers) for resolution. For this type of advice a new subdivision of the Council was formed that came to act like an administrative court (though the formal decision rested with the Crown). This function of high administrative court was enlarged in the succeeding century. Finally, the 1861 law made the Council the institution that would exercise royal authority in the absence of the king or a regent. This case did happen for short periods in 1889 and 1890, in those periods the Council served as regent for King William III under the Vice-President Gerlach Cornelis Joannes van Reenen. 

In 1887 the revised constitution opened the way for making the Council a formal administrative court. This did not actually happen before 1963 when the Wet Beroep Administratieve Beschikkingen (BAB, Administrative Decisions Review Act) was enacted, replaced in 1976 by the Wet Administratief Beroep Overheidsbeschikkingen (AROB, Administrative Decisions Appeals Act). This setup was changed in 1988, because the European Court of Human Rights had deemed in Benthem v Netherlands that the fact that the Council of State was not an independent institution ran contrary to the provisions of the European Convention on Human Rights. To permanently remedy this defect the "judicial" part of the Council was in 1994 made formally independent from the part that advised on legislative matters. This split in two separate parts was confirmed in the most recent revision (2010) of the Council of State Act.

Membership

Vice-Presidents

References

Sources
  (1995), The Dutch Republic: Its Rise, Greatness and Fall, 1477-1806, Oxford University Press,  hardback,  paperback
  Geschiedenis Raad van State

External links
 

Dutch political institutions
High Councils of State
Administrative courts
Constitutional courts
Courts in the Netherlands
Netherlands
1531 establishments in Europe
Courts and tribunals established in 1531
Privy councils